The Los Chancas mine is a large copper mine located in the Apurímac Region of southern Peru. Los Chancas represents one of the largest copper reserves in Peru and in the world, having an estimated 726 million tonnes of ore grading 0.47% copper, 0.04% molybdenum and 0.9 million oz of gold.

See also 
List of mines in Peru

Zinc mining

References 

Copper mines in Peru
Gold mines in Peru